The 1994 Belgian Cup Final took place on 22 May 1994 between Anderlecht and Club Brugge. Anderlecht defeated Club Brugge 2-0. It was the 39th Belgian Cup final, and the second final in which Club Brugge and Anderlecht met each other. In 1977, Club Brugge defeated Anderlecht 4-3.

Route to the final

Match

Summary
After a long battle with Club Brugge, Anderlecht had managed to win the 1993–94 Belgian First Division on the penultimate matchday. Club Brugge was left without a trophy but had a chance for revenge and a consolation prize with the cup final only a week after the end of the league. In the league, Club Brugge had not lost against Anderlecht (0-0 and 0-3) and was deemed slight favorite before the match.

Due to construction at the King Baudouin Stadium, the game was exceptionally played at the Stade Maurice Dufrasne in Liège.

Anderlecht, who were mainly dangerous on counterattacks, managed to score during the first half following a bad pass from Dirk Medved. Bruno Versavel rounded goalkeeper Dany Verlinden to open the scoring. After half time Lorenzo Staelens, who had scored a hattrick against Anderlecht in the league, scored an equalizer which was disallowed after an earlier foul by a teammate. Immediately thereafter Luc Nilis scored the 2-0 on assist from Bruno Versavel. No further goals were scored, allowing Anderlecht to win both league and cup for the third time in their history

Details

External links
  

1994
Cup Final
Club Brugge KV matches
R.S.C. Anderlecht matches